Frank Rahim Turner (born May 25, 1988) is an American professional basketball player who last played for MZT Skopje. Standing at 5 ft 11 in (1.80 m), Turner plays as point guard.

Turner graduated from Atlantic City High School in 2006.

Career
In December 2014, Turner signed with the Romanian team U BT Cluj-Napoca.

On July 14, 2016, Turner signed with ADA Blois Basket of the French LNB Pro B.

On August 31, 2017, Turner signed with Crailsheim Merlins of the German second division ProA. Turner played two seasons with Crailsheim.

On September 7, 2019, he has signed with Egis Körmend of the NB I/A.

Honours and titles

Club
Rilski Sportist
Bulgarian Cup: 2016
EiffelTowers Den Bosch
Dutch Basketball League: 2011–12
Trefl Sopot
Polish Cup: 2013

Individual awards
All-DBL Team: 2011–12
DBL assists leader (2): 2010–11, 2011–12
DBL steals leader: 2010–11
DBL All-Star Game MVP: 2012
DBL All-Star: 2012

References

External links
Profile at courtside.com

1988 births
Living people
ADA Blois Basket 41 players
American expatriate basketball people in Belgium
American expatriate basketball people in France
American expatriate basketball people in Germany
American expatriate basketball people in Hungary
American expatriate basketball people in the Netherlands
American men's basketball players
Antwerp Giants players
Atlantic City High School alumni
Basketball players from New Jersey
BC Körmend players
BC Rilski Sportist players
Canisius Golden Griffins men's basketball players
Crailsheim Merlins players
CS Universitatea Cluj-Napoca (men's basketball) players
Heroes Den Bosch players
Dutch Basketball League players
Fos Provence Basket players
Point guards
Sportspeople from Atlantic City, New Jersey
Trefl Sopot players